Rotvær Lighthouse is a coastal lighthouse in Lødingen Municipality in Nordland county, Norway.

History
In 1985, the old lighthouse was closed and a new automated, electric fiberglass light was installed near the old tower. The 25,400-candela light is white, red, or green light depending on the viewing direction and it is occulting once every 6 seconds.

See also

Lighthouses in Norway
List of lighthouses in Norway

References

External links
 Norsk Fyrhistorisk Forening 

Lighthouses completed in 1914
Lødingen
Lighthouses in Nordland